Columbia Peak is a  elevation glaciated summit located  northwest of Valdez in the Chugach Mountains of the U.S. state of Alaska. Columbia Peak is named in association with the Columbia Glacier, which in turn was named after Columbia University, and is one of several glaciers in the area named for elite U.S. colleges by the Harriman Alaska expedition in 1899. The mountain's local name was reported in 1906 by the United States Geological Survey.

Climate

Based on the Köppen climate classification, Columbia Peak is located in a subarctic climate zone with long, cold, snowy winters, and mild summers. Weather systems coming off the Gulf of Alaska are forced upwards by the Chugach Mountains (orographic lift), causing heavy precipitation in the form of rainfall and snowfall. Temperatures can drop below −20 °C with wind chill factors below −30 °C. This climate supports the Meares and Columbia Glaciers surrounding this mountain. The months May through June offer the most favorable weather for climbing or viewing.

See also

List of mountain peaks of Alaska
Geography of Alaska

Gallery

References

External links
 Weather: Columbia Peak
  National Weather Service Forecast
 Columbia Peak from Columbia Bay: Flickr photo

Landforms of Chugach Census Area, Alaska
Mountains of Alaska
North American 2000 m summits